Corbin/Hanner was an American country music group founded by Bob Corbin and David Hanner. They began as a five-piece band called the Corbin/Hanner Band in 1979. Corbin and Hanner served as lead vocalists and guitarists, with Al Snyder (keyboards), Kip Paxton (bass guitar), and Dave Freeland (drums) completing the lineup. The quintet released two albums for Alfa Records before disbanding in 1984. Corbin and Hanner reunited in 1990 as a duo, recording two more albums for Mercury Records, followed by four more albums on independent labels before disbanding in 2000. Although they never reached Top 40, the group charted eleven singles on the Billboard country charts: six as the Corbin/Hanner Band, and five more as Corbin/Hanner. Their highest charting singles as a band were 1981's "Livin' the Good Life" and 1982's "Everybody Knows I'm Yours" both at No. 46, while their highest as a duo was 1992's "I Will Stand by You" at  No. 49.

History
Bob Corbin and David Hanner, natives of the Western Pennsylvania community of Ford City, began their musical collaboration in high school. The duo's members initially played in a rock band called the Lost Lambs later and more famously in a country rock band called Gravel, which performed throughout Pennsylvania and West Virginia. Eventually, Gravel was reformed as The Corbin/Hanner Band, which included Corbin and Hanner as lead vocalists and guitarists, along with Al Snyder (keyboards), Kip Paxton (bass guitar), and Dave Freeland (drums). Under this lineup, they would record two albums for Alfa Records, in addition to charting several singles on the Billboard country music charts. The band's members parted ways in 1984 after a final performance in Pittsburgh, Pennsylvania. After this performance, Corbin and Hanner worked as songwriters, with Hanner writing Don Williams' "Lord, I Hope This Day Is Good" and Corbin writing Alabama's "Can't Keep a Good Man Down".

Corbin and Hanner reunited in 1990. That year, they were signed to Mercury Records as the duo Corbin/Hanner. Two additional albums — 1990's Black and White Photograph and 1992's Just Another Hill — were released on Mercury, as were additional chart singles. A live album originally recorded in 1982 was released in 1997, followed by 1998's Every Stranger Has a Story (the title track of which was later recorded by Kenny Rogers), 1999's By Request, and Originals in 2000.

The duo retired in 2014.

Discography

As Corbin/Hanner Band

Albums

Singles

As Corbin/Hanner

Albums

Singles

Music videos

References

External links

American country music groups
Country music duos
Mercury Records artists
Musical groups established in 1979
People from Ford City, Pennsylvania